The 1990 New Zealand Royal Visit Honours were appointments by Elizabeth II to the Royal Victorian Order and Queen's Service Order, to mark her visit to New Zealand in February that year. During the tour, she officially closed the Commonwealth Games in Auckland, and attended celebrations marking the 150th anniversary of the Treaty of Waitangi. The honours were announced on 14 and 16 February 1990.

The recipients of honours are displayed here as they were styled before their new honour.

Royal Victorian Order

Lieutenant (LVO)
 Group Captain Norman Eric Richardson – Royal New Zealand Air Force (retired)
 Detective Superintendent Colin Walter Wilson – New Zealand Police

Member (MVO)
 Bernard Joseph Frahm
 Michael John Fokker
 Squadron Leader Brian Edward Joblin – Royal New Zealand Air Force
 Major George Sean Trengrove – Royal New Zealand Armoured Corps

Companion of the Queen's Service Order (QSO)

For public services
 Paul Charles Cotton  – New Zealand Secretary to The Queen

References

1990 awards
Royal Visit Honours
Monarchy in New Zealand